The hyaline fish (Sinocyclocheilus hyalinus) is a species of ray-finned fish in the family Cyprinidae. This threatened species is found only in Yunnan in China. Like many other cavefish, it lacks scales, pigmentation and external eyes. The first recorded description of an obligate cavefish involved this species, when mentioned in 1540 in the travel notes of Yingjing Xie, a local governor of Guangxi.

Sources

Cave fish
hyalinus
Fish described in 1993
Taxonomy articles created by Polbot